Josef Pal was a U.S. soccer player who earned one cap with the U.S. national team in a 1-0 World Cup qualification win over Honduras on March 17, 1965.  He spent his club career with the German American Soccer League.  In 1962, he was with New York Hungaria when it won the National Challenge Cup.

United States men's international soccer players
German-American Soccer League players
Possibly living people
Year of birth missing
Place of birth missing
American soccer players

Association footballers not categorized by position